Nafisa Joseph (28 March 1978 – 29 July 2004) was an Indian model and MTV video jockey. She was the winner of Femina Miss India Universe 1997 and was a finalist in the Miss Universe 1997 pageant in Miami Beach.

Early life 
Nafisa Joseph was born on 28 March 1978 in Delhi, and was brought up in Bangalore, Karnataka. She was the younger of two daughters born to father Nirmal Joseph, and mother Usha Joseph, a Bengali, who was a descendant of Tagore. Nafisa studied at Bishop Cotton Girls' School and St. Joseph's College, both at Bangalore. She owed her Islamic first name to the fact that her paternal grandmother may have been Muslim.

Career 
Joseph started modelling at age 12 when her neighbour got her an opportunity to model for a Wearhouse ad. She was groomed as a model by Prasad Bidapa. Joseph was the youngest participant at the Miss India pageant in 1997, which she won.
Joseph participated in the Miss Universe Pageant in Miami Beach, Florida on 16 May 1997, and was among the 10 semifinalists in the pageant.

In 1999, she was a judge for the MTV India VJ Hunt and was also a VJ for MTV. A week later she was called for a screen test to host a show on MTV . She ran the MTV House Full show for close to five years. She also acted in a television series C.A.T.S., an Indian version of Charlie's Angels for Sony Entertainment Television. In 2004, she hosted a show Style on Star World. She also launched a television programming unit 2's Company with the help of her fiancé, Gautam Khanduja. She edited a magazine called Gurlz. She also had a brief cameo in the Subhash Ghai film Taal.

In addition to modeling and hosting duties, Joseph was a lover of animals and campaigned for Welfare of Stray Dogs (WSD), People for the Ethical Treatment of Animals (PETA) and People for Animals (PFA), organizations for animal protection, and wrote a weekly column called Nafisa for Animals in the Bangalore edition of the Times of India.

Death 
Joseph hanged herself in her flat in Versova on 29 July 2004. She was to marry businessman Gautam Khanduja in a few weeks' time. According to her parents, Joseph took the step because her marriage was called off. This was due to Joseph having discovered that Khanduja was still married, although having told her he had been divorced for two years. When confronted, Khanduja refused to answer questions about his marital life or produce divorce papers that he had previously claimed he had filed. Instead, press reports at the time mention that he then threatened her with blackmail, probably after she threatened to confront his wife.

Joseph's parents filed a police report accusing her fiancé for her death, claiming that Khanduja had been desperate to get out of the wedding for some time, and sought his custodial interrogation. In November 2005, the trial against Khanduja was stayed by the Bombay High Court until January 2006. Khanduja claimed that there was no evidence to prove that breaking off the engagement had led to Joseph's suicide.

See also 
 Suicide in India
 Jiah Khan

References 

1978 births
2004 deaths
20th-century Indian actresses
Actresses from Bangalore
Femina Miss India winners
Female models from Bangalore
Female suicides
Indian television actresses
Miss Universe 1997 contestants
Suicides by hanging in India
Indian VJs (media personalities)
2004 suicides
Artists who committed suicide